is a public university in Miyazaki, Miyazaki, Japan, established in 1993.

External links
 Official website 

Educational institutions established in 1993
Public universities in Japan
Universities and colleges in Miyazaki Prefecture
1993 establishments in Japan